Maniacs in Japan is a live album by Brazilian heavy metal band Viper. It is a recording of a concert in Club Cittá, Tokyo on 18 April 1993. Most, but not all, of this concert can be watched in the documentary 20 Years Living for the Night.

Track listing

Personnel
Pit Passarell - vocals, bass guitar
Yves Passarell - guitars
Felipe Machado - guitars
Renato Graccia - drums

References

Viper (band) albums
1993 live albums